This page is a list of all past and present minesweepers of the Royal Netherlands Navy, including shallow water, coastal and oceangoing minesweepers of the Mine Service. Auxiliary minesweepers which have aided the Royal Netherlands Navy are not included.

M class minesweepers 
 Hr. Ms. M 1 (1918 - 1949)
 Hr. Ms. M 2 (1918 - 1940)
 Hr. Ms. M 3 (1918 - 1940)
 Hr. Ms. M 4 (1918 - 1992)

A class minesweepers 

 Hr. Ms. A (1930 - 1942) (1943 - 1945 in Japanese service)
 Hr. Ms. B (1930 - 1942) (1942 - 1945 in Japanese service)
 Hr. Ms. C (1930 - 1942) (1943 - 1944 in Japanese service)
 Hr. Ms. D (1930 - 1942)

Jan van Amstel class 

 Hr. Ms. Jan van Amstel (1937 - 1942)
 Hr. Ms. Pieter de Bitter (1937 - 1942)
 Hr. Ms. Abraham Crijnssen (1937 - 1961)
 Hr. Ms. Eland Dubois (1937 - 1942)
 Hr. Ms. Willem van Ewijck (1937 - 1939)
 Hr. Ms. Pieter Florisz (1937 - 1962) (1940 - 1945 in German service)
 Hr. Ms. Jan van Gelder (1937 - 1961)
 Hr. Ms. Abraham van der Hulst (1937 - 1940) (1940 - 1945 in German service)
 Hr. Ms. Abraham van der Hulst (1946 - 1961) (1940 - 1945 in German service)

Type MMS

105 feet 
 Hr. Ms. Ameland (1942 - 1957)
 Hr. Ms. Beveland (1942 - 1957)
 Hr. Ms. Marken (1942 - 1944)
 Hr. Ms. Marken (1944 - 1957)
 Hr. Ms. Putten (1942 - 1957)
 Hr. Ms. Rozenburg (1942 - 1957)
 Hr. Ms. Terschelling (1942 - 1942)
 Hr. Ms. Terschelling (1943 - 1957)
 Hr. Ms. Texel (1942 - 1957)
 Hr. Ms. Vlieland (1942 - 1952)

126 feet 
 Hr. Ms. Duiveland (1943 - 1952)
 Hr. Ms. Overflakkee (1944 - 1954)
 Hr. Ms. Schokland (1944 - 1949)
 Hr. Ms. Tholen (1943 - 1952)
 Hr. Ms. Voorne (1943 - 1952)
 Hr. Ms. Walcheren (1943 - 1946)
 Hr. Ms. Wieringen (1943 - 1949)
 Hr. Ms. IJsselmonde (1943 - 1952)

Batjan class 
 Hr. Ms. Ambon (1946 - 1950)
 Hr. Ms. Banda (1946 - 1950)
 Hr. Ms. Batjan (1946 - 1958)
 Hr. Ms. Boeroe (1946 -1958)
 Hr. Ms. Ceram (1946 - 1958)
 Hr. Ms. Morotai (1946 - 1949)
 Hr. Ms. Ternate (1946 - ????)
 Hr. Ms. Tidore (1946 - 1949)

Borndiep class 
 Hr. Ms. Borndiep (1946 - 1962)
 Hr. Ms. Deurloo (1946 - 1962)
 Hr. Ms. Hollandsdiep (1946 - 1957)
 Hr. Ms. Marsdiep (1947 - 1956)
 Hr. Ms. Oosterschelde (1947 - 1957)
 Hr. Ms. Texelstroom (1947 - 1976)
 Hr. Ms. Vliestroom (1947 - 1962)
 Hr. Ms. Volkerak (1946 - 1957)
 Hr. Ms. Westerschelde (1946 - 1957)
 Hr. Ms. Zuiderdiep (1947 - 1962)

Beemster class 
 Hr. Ms. Bedum (1953 - 1976)
 Hr. Ms. Beemster (1953 - 1974)
 Hr. Ms. Beilen (1954 - 1975)
 Hr. Ms. Blaricum (1954 - 1976)
 Hr. Ms. Bolsward (1953 - 1972)
 Hr. Ms. Borculo (1953 - 1974)
 Hr. Ms. Borne (1953 - 1975)
 Hr. Ms. Boxtel (1954 - 1976)
 Hr. Ms. Breskens (1954 - 1976)
 Hr. Ms. Breukelen (1954 - 1972)
 Hr. Ms. Brielle (1954 - 1975)
 Hr. Ms. Brouwershaven (1954 - 1973)
 Hr. Ms. Bruinisse (1954 - 1972)
 Hr. Ms. Brummen (1954 - 1976)

Aggressive class 

 Hr. Ms. Onbevreesd (1954 - 1982)
 Hr. Ms. Onverdroten (1954 -1982)
 Hr. Ms. Onvermoeid (1954 -1971)
 Hr. Ms. Onversaagd (1954 - 1976)
 Hr. Ms. Onverschrokken (1954 - 1972)
 Hr. Ms. Onvervaard (1955 - 1982)

Wildervank class 

 Hr. MS. Aalsmeer (1956 - 1974)
 Hr. Ms. Axel (1956 - 1974)
 Hr. Ms. Elst (1956 - 1970)
 Hr. Ms. Gieten (1956 - 1969)
 Hr. Ms. Goes (1956 - 1977)
 Hr. Ms. Grijpskerk (1956 - 1993)
 Hr. Ms. Leersum (1957 - 1977)
 Hr. Ms. Lisse (1957 - 1969)
 Hr. Ms. Lochem (1956 - 1969)
 Hr. Ms. Meppel (1956 - 1977)
 Hr. Ms. Sneek (1957 - 1969)
 Hr. Ms. Steenwijk (1956 - 1969)
 Hr. Ms. Waalwijk (1956 - 1977)
 Hr. Ms. Wildervank (1955 - 1977)

Dokkum class 

 Hr. Ms. Abcoude (1956 - 1994)
 Hr. Ms. Dokkum (1955-1985)
 Hr. Ms. Drachten (1956 - 1999)
 Hr. Ms. Drunen (1956 - 1984)
 Hr. Ms. Gemert (1956 - 1993)
 Hr. Ms. Giethoorn (1956 - 1993)
 Hr. Ms. Hoogeveen (1956 - 1999)
 Hr. Ms. Hoogezand (1955 - 1993)
 Hr. Ms. Naaldwijk (1955 - 2000)
 Hr. Ms. Naarden (1956 - 1999)
 Hr. Ms. Ommen (1956 - 1997)
 Hr. Ms. Rhenen (1956 - 1984)
 Hr. Ms. Roermond (1955 - 1995)
 Hr. Ms. Sittard 1956 - 1999)
 Hr. Ms. Staphorst (1957 - 1984)
 Hr. Ms. Veere (1956 - 1984)
 Hr. Ms. Venlo (1956 - 1993)
 Hr. Ms. Woerden (1957 - 1990)

Van Straelen class 
 Hr. Ms. Alblas (1960 - 1983)
 Hr. Ms. Bussemaker (1960 - 1983)
 Hr. Ms. Chömpff (1960 - 1983)
 Hr. Ms. Houtepen (1962 - 1983)
 Hr. Ms. Lacomblé (1960 - 1983)
 Hr. Ms. Mahu (1961 - 1983)
 Hr. Ms. Schuiling (1961 - 1983)
 Hr. Ms. Staverman (1962 - 1983)
 Hr. Ms. Van der Wel (1961 - 1983)
 Hr. Ms. Van Hamel (1960 - 1983)
 Hr. Ms. Van Moppes (1960 - 1983)
 Hr. Ms. Van Straelen (1960 - 1983)
 Hr. Ms. Van 't Hoff (1961 - 1983)
 Hr. Ms. Van Versendaal (1962 - 1983)
 Hr. Ms. Van Well Groeneveld (1961 - 1983)
 Hr. Ms. Zomer (1961 - 1983)

See also

References

Bibliography